Jason Smith (born 13 August 1972) is a former Australian rules footballer who played with Richmond in the Australian Football League (AFL).

Smith was originally from Lockington and attended Assumption College, before being selected in the 1989 National Draft. He played in the opening round of the 1991 AFL season, against St Kilda at Waverley Park. It was his only senior appearance. He was a reserves player at Carlton in 1994.

References

External links
 
 

1972 births
Australian rules footballers from Victoria (Australia)
Richmond Football Club players
Living people